Young Blood is the 38th studio album by Jerry Lee Lewis released in 1995. Musicians included James Burton on lead guitar, Buddy Harman and Andy Paley on drums, and Al Anderson and Kenny Lovelace on guitar.

Background
The album was released on Sire Records on May 23, 1995. It was recorded at Blue Jay Recording Studio, Carlisle, Massachusetts, House of Blues Studios, Memphis, Tennessee, Lewis Ranch, Nesbit, Mississippi, Sunset Sound Factory, Los Angeles, California, and Your Place Or Mine Studio, Glendale, California. It featured an all-star cast of musicians including James Burton, Buddy Harman, Joey Spampinato, Andy Paley and Kenny Lovelace.

The release was a comeback album which attempted to recapture the 1950s Sun Records style which Jerry Lee Lewis was most known for. There is heavy echo and a back-to-basics instrumentation with little or no reliance on synthesizers or studio effects.

The single that was released was "Goosebumps" backed by "Crown Victoria Custom '51". A music video was released that featured the song "Goosebumps". "Crown Victoria Custom '51" is played in the style of Jerry Lee Lewis' first and most iconic recording, "Whole Lotta Shakin' Goin' On" from 1957. The video also made an appearance on an episode of Beavis & Butthead

Track listing
"I'll Never Get Out of This World Alive" (Fred Rose, Hank Williams) - 2:11
"Goosebumps" (Al Anderson, Andy Paley) - 2:33
"Things" (Bobby Darin) - 2:43
"Miss the Mississippi and You" (William Halley, Eric Schoenberg) - 3:37
"Young Blood" (Jerry Leiber, Mike Stoller) - 2:19
"Crown Victoria Custom '51" (Andy Paley, Jerry Lee Lewis, James Burton, Kenny Lovelace) - 3:02
"High Blood Pressure" (Huey Piano Smith) - 2:53
"Restless Heart" (Andy Paley, James Burton, Julie Richmond, Kenny Lovelace) - 2:46
"Gotta Travel On" (Dave Lazer, Fred Hellerman, Larry Ehrlich, Lee Hays, Paul Clayton, Pete Seeger, Ronnie Gilbert) - 2:05
"Down the Road a Piece" (Don Raye) - 2:28
"It Was the Whiskey Talkin' (Not Me)" (Andy Paley, Jonathan Paley, Michael Kernan, Ned Claflin) - 3:40
"Poison Love" (Elmer Laird) - 3:44
"One of them Old Things" (Hoy Lindsey, Joel Sonnier) - 2:49
"House of Blue Lights" (Don Raye, Freddie Slack) - 1:51

Personnel
 Jerry Lee Lewis - vocals, piano
 James Burton - guitar
 Buddy Harman - drums
 Kenny Lovelace - guitar, fiddle
 Andy Paley - drums, backing vocals
 Joey Spampinato - bass
 Al Anderson - guitar
 Don Allen - drums
 Stuart Aptekar - horns and reeds
 Tom Ardonlino - drums
 Yoshihiro Arita - strings
 Don Baer - guitar
 Craig Ball - horns and reeds
 Jerry Byrd - bass
 Glen Colson - drums
 John Curtis - strings
 Elliot Easton - guitar
 Bob Efford - horns and reeds
 Matt Glaser - strings
 Bob Glaub - bass
 Michael Kernan - guitar, backing vocals
 Bobby B. Keyes - guitar
 Frank Macchia - horns and reeds
 Frank Marocco - accordion
 Jonathan Paley - bass
 Dave Roe Rorick - bass
 Mike Turk - harmonica
 Robby Turner - pedal steel guitar
 Stanley Watkins - horns and reeds
 Dan Weinstein - horns and reeds
 Billy West - backing vocals
 David Whitney - horns and reeds

Reception

The album was assessed favorably in The Encyclopedia of Music in the 20th Century: "Though performances in the 1980s exhibited a slightly reserved Jerry Lee Lewis, his 1995 album Young Blood showed a return to his old form."

In The Rough Guide to Rock 2003, Peter Buckley wrote: "1995's album, Young Blood, showed him potent as ever".

Sources
Bonomo, Joe (2009). Jerry Lee Lewis: Lost and Found. New York: Continuum Books.
Bragg, Rick. (2014). Jerry Lee Lewis: His Own Story. New York: Harper.
Tosches, Nick (1982). Hellfire. New York: Grove Press.
Gutterman, Jimmy (1991). Rockin' My Life Away: Listening to Jerry Lee Lewis. Nashville: Rutledge Hill Press.
Lewis, Myra; Silver, Murray (1981). Great Balls of Fire: The Uncensored Story of Jerry Lee Lewis. William Morrow/Quill/St. Martin's Press.Legends of American Music. Half a Century of Hits.'' Jerry Lee Lewis. Time-Life Music. 2006.

References

Jerry Lee Lewis albums
1995 albums
Albums produced by Andy Paley